The sixth season of the American crime thriller television series The Blacklist premiered on NBC on Thursday, January 3, 2019 at 10:00 PM, followed by its time slot premiere on Friday, January 4 at 9:00 PM. The season contained 22 episodes and concluded on May 17 the same year. Early episode reviews noted that the sixth season was more serialized than previous ones, focusing more on the stories of its main characters and the emotional fallout of recent events.

The series continues to be produced by Davis Entertainment, Universal Television and Sony Pictures Television, and executive produced by Jon Bokenkamp, John Davis, John Eisendrath, John Fox, and Joe Carnahan.

Overview 
The sixth season builds on the story line revealed in the fifth season finale, which showed that the real Raymond Reddington was already dead and that the man claiming to be him (James Spader) was an impostor. The two-part season premiere explored two characters who are crucial in this narrative: Dr. Hans Koehler (Kenneth Tigar), a master of facial reconstruction and Bastien Moreau or The Corsican (Christopher Lambert). Elizabeth Keen begins digging into the mysteries of Reddington's lie. The season begins to unravel the mystery who the fake Reddington really is and whether the remains of the real Reddington found in the past season are those of Keen's real father. During the season, Raymond, Elizabeth and FBI Task Force are faced with conspiracy which threatens to destroy them forever. A new series antagonist is an U. S. Assistant Attorney General and presidential advisor (Jennifer Ferrin), who is the major architect of conspiracy and works with another person in their nefarious criminal scheme.

Cast

Main cast
 James Spader as Raymond "Red" Reddington
 Megan Boone as Elizabeth Keen
 Diego Klattenhoff as Donald Ressler 
 Harry Lennix as Harold Cooper
 Amir Arison as Aram Mojtabai
 Mozhan Marnò as Samar Navabi
 Hisham Tawfiq as Dembe Zuma

Recurring
 Fiona Dourif as Jennifer Reddington/Lillian Roth, Red's daughter and Liz's ally in her pursuit of the truth about Red
 Christopher Lambert as Bastien Moreau, AKA The Corsican, a nationalist assassin obsessed with keeping his true identity secret
 Dikran Tulaine as Max, a skilled bomb maker and longtime acquaintance of Red's
 Becky Ann Baker as Roberta Wilkins, a Federal judge overseeing Red's trial
 Ken Leung as Michael Sima, an Assistant U. S. Attorney prosecuting Red
 Mike Boland as Jim Macatee, the warden of the Federal prison where Red is being held
 Coy Stewart as Vontae Jones, a young prison inmate befriended by Red
 Benito Martinez as Robert Diaz, the corrupt President of the United States
 Jennifer Ferrin as Anna McMahon, a United States President's advisor running a criminal conspiracy with Robert Diaz
 Deidre Lovejoy as Cynthia Panabaker, the White House Counsel
 Clark Middleton as Glen Carter, a DMV employee who occasionally assists Red
 Oded Fehr as Levi Shur, a Mossad agent and the former partner of Samar Navabi
 Javier Molina as Vega Montero, a Federal prison inmate who assists Red
 Laila Robins as Katarina Rostova
 Jonathan Holtzman as Chuck

Episodes

Reception

Critical response
A 100% approval rating for the sixth season was reported by Rotten Tomatoes, with an average rating of 9.3/10 based on 5 reviews.

Ratings

References

External links
 
 

2019 American television seasons
6